Brian Shaw (born May 20, 1962) is a Canadian former professional ice hockey player.

Early life 
Shaw was born in Edmonton. He played junior hockey with the Portland Winter Hawks,and was a member of the 1981–82 that won the President's Cup.

Career 
Shaw was selected by the Chicago Blackhawks in fourth round (78th overall) of the 1980 NHL Entry Draft. He played five seasons in the American Hockey League and International Hockey League registering a combined total of 224 points and 506 penalty minutes in 315 professional games.

Personal life 
Shaw is the nephew of the late coach Brian C. Shaw.

Career statistics

References

External links

1962 births
Living people
Adirondack Red Wings players
Canadian ice hockey right wingers
Chicago Blackhawks draft picks
Ice hockey people from Edmonton
Peoria Prancers players
Peoria Rivermen (IHL) players
Portland Winterhawks players
Springfield Indians players
St. Albert Saints players